Phil McGuire may refer to:

 Phil McGuire (footballer) (born 1980), Scottish footballer
 Phil McGuire (field hockey) (born 1970), British former field hockey player